The Perdido Key Historic District is a U.S. historic district (designated as such on March 10, 1980) located southwest of Warrington, Florida. The district is a  section on the eastern tip of Perdido Key. The area was formerly a separate islet known as Foster's Bank, where Fort McRee was built.

References

External links
 Escambia County listings at National Register of Historic Places
 Florida's Office of Cultural and Historical Programs
 Escambia County listings
 History of Fort McRee

National Register of Historic Places in Escambia County, Florida
Historic districts on the National Register of Historic Places in Florida